El Dabaa (  ) is a town in the Matrouh Governorate, Egypt. It is famous for the Russian technology nuclear power plant being constructed to the north east of the city boundaries.

As of 2017, El Dabaa had an estimated population of 49,805.

In 2012, a story published in the news section of Nature Journal website, stated that:"... [radioactive] material was taken from a laboratory at the El Dabaa nuclear power plant on the country’s Mediterranean coast." But as of 2020, the El Dabaa nuclear power plant was only bare land. As of 2017, only the first stage of preliminary engineering survey was conducted and the hydrographic and hydrological survey work was carried on. The construction on the plant was expected to start in 2020, but at the beginning of 2021 it was still in the waiting.

El Dabaa has been targeted by protesters who are claiming that their land was wrongly taken by the government to make way for the nuclear plant. As of 2012, and as a result of those protests, the proposed construction site was shut down. The protests that targeted El Dabaa was ended by the court announcing that they had the right to the land.

El Dabaa Nuclear Project

The residents of El Dabaa decided to give up the land. The Armed Forces thanked the residents of El-Dabaa for their contributions in handing over the land allocated for the establishment of nuclear power plant. In a statement released on 30 September 2013, Egyptian Army spokesman Ahmed Mohammed Ali said that the Army is committed to taking the necessary procedures to compensate those affected from the project.

On 7 November 2013 President Adly Mansour announced that the nuclear power program will be restarted. On 14 November 2013, a spokesman for the electricity ministry named Aktham Abouelela stated that the tender to build the reactor will begin in January 2014, though it has been delayed until the end of 2014. The target year for operation is 2019; the plant would be used for 60 years. The plant would function as a light water reactor and would have a capacity of 950 to 1,650 megawatts.

In November 2015 and March 2017 Egypt signed preliminary agreements with Russian nuclear company Rosatom for a first VVER-1200 unit to start in 2024. In November 2017 preliminary contracts for the construction of four VVER-1200 units were signed in the presence of Egyptian President Abdel Fattah el-Sisi and Russian President Vladimir Putin.

Climate 
Köppen-Geiger climate classification system classifies its climate as hot desert (BWh), but it is highly moderated by its proximity to the Mediterranean Sea along the northern coast of Egypt.

References 

Populated places in Matrouh Governorate